Fairfax Mastick Cone (February 21, 1903 – June 20, 1977) or Fax Cone, was an American businessperson, advertising executive and the former director of the American Association of Advertising Agencies.

Early years 
Cone's father was a prospector and a mining engineer. His mother, Isabelle Fairfax Williams (1869–1940), was a schoolteacher in San Francisco. In 1921 Cone enrolled at the University of California, Berkeley, originally intending to be an illustrator.  Eventually he graduated with a degree in English.  Due to a problem with his credentials, Cone got a job as an advertising clerk with the San Francisco Examiner rather than a teaching fellowship.  In 1928, Cone left the paper for an advertising agency, thus embarking on a career that would leave an indelible mark on his life.

Advertising career 
After a year with the L.H. Waldron advertising agency, Cone joined Lord and Thomas as a copywriter.  Despite health problems stemming from an over-active pancreas, Cone steadily rose up the corporate ladder, eventually impressing the head of the firm, Albert Lasker.

In 1941, Lasker wished to retire and liquidate Lord and Thomas, but he passed of the bulk of the agency's clients to three of his rising stars; Emerson Foote, Don Belding, and Cone.  On December 29, 1942, the three opened a new agency, Foote, Cone and Belding.

Following the retirements of Foote and Belding (whose positions were subsequently filled by others), Cone became the last of the three founders on the board of directors, a position he retained until 1975.  In 1946, he became the director of the American Association of Advertising Agencies. He is sometimes called the "father of modern advertising" and is a member of the American National Business Hall of Fame. He died in Monterey, California.

Quotations 
 Advertising is what you do when you can't go see somebody. That's all it is.
 There is no such thing as a Mass Mind. The Mass Audience is made up of individuals, and good advertising is written always from one person to another. When it is aimed at millions it rarely moves anyone.
 The inventory goes down the elevator every night.

References 
 Time; Up the Elevator; Friday, December 9, 1966; "'Show me this young genius!' demanded fearsome George Washington Hill, onetime president of the American Tobacco Co., of Adman Albert Lasker back in 1941. Out came Fairfax Mastick Cone, then 38, with what soon became the cigarette slogan of the '40s: 'With men who know tobacco best ... it's Luckies two to one.' When he retired a year later, Lasker was apparently still amazed by his upstart protége's Lucky stroke: in any event, Lasker sold his agency to Cone and two other staffers at a gift price of $167,500. Now known as Foote, Cone & Belding Inc."

External links 
 Cone's ANBHF biography
Guide to the Fairfax M. Cone Papers 1947-1971 at the University of Chicago Special Collections Research Center

1903 births
1977 deaths
American advertising executives
Businesspeople from San Francisco